Çiftlik (also: Çiftlikköy) is a village in the Gölpazarı District, Bilecik Province, Turkey. Its population is 60 (2021).

References

Villages in Gölpazarı District